Homalopterus is a genus of beetles in the family Megalopodidae, containing the following species:

 ?Homalopterus atrovirens Papp, 1952
 Homalopterus heteroproctus Lacordaire, 1845
 Homalopterus tristis Perty, 1832

References

Megalopodidae genera
Taxa named by Maximilian Perty